The SS Cape Isabel (AKR-5062) was originally launched in 1976 as the SS Nevada, a Type C7 commercial ship. The States SS company took the first contract in 1976 and it operated until it was transferred to Lykes Brothers steamship company and renamed the SS Charles Lykes. Later the ship was reacquired from its commercial roles and brought back under military control via the Maritime Administration and renamed the Cape Isabel. Since then it has been kept in ready reserve status and used occasionally for heavy lifting operations to European theaters to have equipment air-lifted to active engagements. It has heavily participated in Operation Enduring Freedom ferrying goods across the Atlantic to staging points in Europe. As of August 2021, the ship is undergoing recommissioning at Vigor Shipyards in Portland, Oregon.

External links
 http://www.msc.navy.mil/inventory/ships.asp?ship=40 Ship's official page on Military Sealift Command
 http://www.navsource.org/archives/09/54/545062.htm Ship photo index NavSource Online: Service Ship Photo Archive
 http://wikimapia.org/5155486/SS-Cape-Isabel-AKR-5062-SS-Cape-Inscription-AKR-5076 Wikimapia site

285904157143

Ships built in Bath, Maine
1976 ships
Cape I-class cargo ships